The 1987 Connecticut Huskies football team represented the University of Connecticut in the 1987 NCAA Division I-AA football season.  The Huskies were led by fifth year head coach Tom Jackson, and completed the season with a record of 7–4.

Schedule

References

Connecticut
UConn Huskies football seasons
Connecticut Huskies football